is a subway station on the Tokyo Metro Marunouchi Line in Suginami, Tokyo, Japan, operated by the Tokyo subway operator Tokyo Metro.

Lines
It is numbered "M-03".

Station layout
The station consists of two underground side platforms serving two tracks on the first basement level. The platforms are served by their own sets of ticket barriers, with access to the surface from Exits 1 and 2 (from platforms 1 and 2 respectively). The two platforms are also linked by an underground passageway.

Platforms

History
The station was opened on 1 November 1961.

The station facilities were inherited by Tokyo Metro after the privatization of the Teito Rapid Transit Authority (TRTA) in 2004.

Passenger statistics
In fiscal 2011, the station was used by an average of 32,336 passengers daily.

Surrounding area

Its two exits are on either side of Ōme Kaidō Avenue, a major road connecting Shinjuku to the western suburbs of Tokyo. The north exit is adjacent to Look Shōtengai, a pedestrian shopping street popular for its used clothing and music stores.

References

External links

 Shin-koenji Station information (Tokyo Metro)

Stations of Tokyo Metro
Tokyo Metro Marunouchi Line
Railway stations in Tokyo
Railway stations in Japan opened in 1961